The Henry Phipps was a  American Great Lakes freighter that served on the Great Lakes of North America from her launching in 1907 to her scrapping in 1976 by Hyman Michaels Company of Duluth, Minnesota. The Phipps was used to haul bulk cargoes such as iron ore, coal, grain and occasionally limestone.

History

The Henry Phipps (official number 204136) was a product of the West Bay City Shipbuilding Company (F.W. Wheeler Shipyards) of West Bay City, Michigan. She was commissioned by the Pittsburgh Steamship Company (a subsidiary of United States Steel Corporation) of Cleveland, Ohio. She was launched on May 11, 1907 as hull number #623. She had a length of 601-feet, a beam of 58-feet and a height of 32-feet. She had a gross tonnage of 7,676 tons and a net tonnage of 6,426 tons. She was powered by a 2,000 horsepower triple expansion steam engine and fueled by two Scotch marine boilers. She entered service on June 24, 1907. In July 1907 the Phipps ran aground off Pyramid Point on Lake Michigan.

On August 13, 1909, the Phipps "sideswiped" another 600-foot long laker, the Daniel J. Morrell in heavy fog in Whitefish Bay. Both vessels sustained severe damage. The cost to repair the damage done to the Phipps was around $5,000, while the cost to repair the damage done to the Morrell was around  $10,000.

On September 22, 1911 the Phipps rammed and sank the  steel-hulled freighter Joliet off Port Huron, Michigan in the St. Clair River. The Joliet was anchored at the time of the collision. The crew of the Phipps couldn't see the Joliet because their vision was impaired by dense fog. The Joliet sank almost directly over the railway tunnel between Sarnia, Ontario and Port Huron.

In 1942 she was lengthened to 608 feet in length, and re registered to Fairport, Ohio. In 1946 the Phipps was rebuilt with a gross register tonnage of 7,703 tons and a net register tonnage of 6,453 tons. In 1949 the fleet owned by the Pittsburgh Steamship Company was reincorporated in Wilmington, Delaware. In 1951 the Phipps was transferred to the United States Steel Corporation of Cleveland, Ohio and re registered to New York. In 1967 the fleet was renamed United States Steel Great Lakes Fleet.

The scrapping of the Phipps
In late July 1976 the Phipps was taken to a scrapping berth in Duluth, Minnesota, for scrapping by the Hyman Michaels Company. They started scrapping her in November 1976. Her enrollment was surrendered in August 1977.

See also 

1940 Armistice Day Blizzard
Great Lakes Storm of 1913
List of storms on the Great Lakes
Mataafa Storm
Largest shipwrecks on the Great Lakes
List of shipwrecks on the Great Lakes
SS Edmund Fitzgerald
SS Carl D. Bradley
SS Cedarville
SS Chester A. Congdon
SS James Carruthers
SS Henry B. Smith
SS Emperor
SS Isaac M. Scott (1909)
SS Charles S. Price
SS D.M. Clemson (1903)

References

1907 ships
Great Lakes freighters
Steamships of the United States
Maritime incidents in 1909
Maritime incidents in 1907
Ships powered by a triple expansion steam engine
Merchant ships of the United States
Maritime incidents in 1911
Ships built in Bay City, Michigan